Busan Nat'l Univ. of Edu. Station is a station of the Busan Metro Line 1 & Donghae Line in Geoje-dong, Yeonje District, Busan, South Korea.

It was named as such due to its proximity to the Busan National University of Education located on the west side of the station.

Station Layout

Line 1

Donghae Line

Gallery

References

External links

  Cyber station information from Busan Transportation Corporation

Busan Metro stations
Yeonje District
Railway stations opened in 1985
1985 establishments in South Korea
20th-century architecture in South Korea